General Oliver may refer to:

John Morrison Oliver (1828–1872), Union Army brigadier general and brevet major general
Jovan Oliver (ca. 1310–1356), magnate of the Serbian Emperor Dušan the Mighty 
Lunsford E. Oliver (1889–1978), U.S. Army major general
Stephen W. Oliver (fl. 1980s–2020s), U.S. Air Force major general
William Oliver (British Army officer) (1901–1981), British Army lieutenant general